Allianz Tower, also known as Isozaki Tower, is a fifty-floor,  skyscraper in Milan, Italy. Designed by Japanese architect Arata Isozaki and Italian architect Andrea Maffei, it serves as the headquarters of the Italian subsidiary Allianz SpA.

Locally nicknamed Il Dritto (Italian for "The Straight One"), it is the tallest building in Italy at — with broadcast antenna—and with its 50 floors is the tallest to the roof. It is composed by eight modules by six floors each one, with the façade of the module composed by a triple-glass unit slightly curved to outside. The vertical succession of rounded forms create a feeling of slight vibration of the volume of the building as it rises upward. Elevations of the short sides are fully glazed and show the mechanical series of six panoramic lifts going up and down to the various floors of the building.

In 2016, Allianz Tower was nominated by Emporis as the third-best skyscraper that was completed in 2015.

The idea of an endless tower can be compared to previous ambitions of other artists such as Constantin Brâncuși, for example, who in 1937–38 installed one of his endless columns of Târgu Jiu in the park to create repeatable systems indefinitely.

See also 
 List of tallest buildings in Italy

References

Skyscrapers in Milan
Skyscraper office buildings in Italy
Office buildings completed in 2015
Allianz
Arata Isozaki buildings